The lac Otis is a body of water tributary of the southern slope of the Saguenay River via the "ruisseau aux Cailles". It is located in the municipality of Saint-Félix-d'Otis, in the Le Fjord-du-Saguenay Regional County Municipality from the administrative region Saguenay–Lac-Saint-Jean, in the province of Quebec, in Canada.

The southern part of Lake Otis is served by route 170, that is the main street (east-west direction) which passes to the village of the hamlet Lac-Goth and to the village of Saint-Félix-d'Otis going west. A few other secondary forest roads serve the lake sector for forestry and recreational tourism activities. Several dozen chalets are set up, especially around the south-eastern bay where the village of Saint-Félix-d'Otis and the north-eastern bay are located.

Vacationing is the main economic activity in the sector; forestry, second.

The surface of Lake Otis is usually frozen from the end of November to the beginning of April, however the safe circulation on the ice is generally done from mid-December to the end of March.

Geography 
The main watersheds near Lake Otis are:
 north side: Cailles stream, Rivière à la Croix, Saguenay River;
 east side: Rivière à la Croix, Lac à la Croix, Éternity River, Saint-Jean River, Saguenay River;
 south side: Brébeuf Lake, Saint-Jean River, Papinachois stream, Pierre River, Catin river;
 west side: Saguenay River, Baie des Ha! Ha!.

Otis Lake follows the shape of a hook, the top of which is the village bay and the end of the hook being the Anse à Pierre.

The mouth of Otis Lake is located in a bay northwest of the lake, at:
  north of the center of the hamlet of Lac-Goth;
  south of the confluence of the "ruisseau aux Cailles" and the Saguenay River;
  north-west of the village center of Saint-Félix-d'Otis;
  north-east of the "Baie de la Sauvagesse" du Brébeuf Lake;
  north-east of the confluence of the Ha! Ha! River And Saguenay River;
  east of downtown Saguenay (city);
  west of downtown Tadoussac.

Toponymy 
The toponym "Lac Otis" was formalized on December 5, 1968, by the Commission de toponymie du Québec.

Notes and references

Notes

Related articles 
 Le Fjord-du-Saguenay Regional County Municipality
 Saint-Félix-d'Otis, a municipality
 Saguenay River

Lakes of Saguenay–Lac-Saint-Jean
Le Fjord-du-Saguenay Regional County Municipality